A Garratt (often referred to as a Beyer Garratt) is a type of steam locomotive invented by British engineer Herbert William Garratt that is articulated into three parts. Its boiler, firebox, and cab are mounted on a centre frame or "bridge". The two other parts, one at each end, have a pivot to support the central frame; they consist of a steam engine unit – with driving wheels, trailing wheels, valve gear, and cylinders, and above it, fuel and/or water storage.

Articulation permits locomotives to negotiate curves that might restrict large rigid-framed locomotives. The design also provides more driving wheels per unit of locomotive weight, permitting operation on lightly engineered track. Garratt locomotives produced as much as twice the power output of the largest conventional locomotives of railways that introduced them, reducing the need for multiple locomotives and crews.

Advantages of the Garratt concept

The principal benefit of the Garratt design is that the boiler and firebox unit are slung between the two engine units.

As Oswald Nock wrote, the Garratt type holds several advantages over the Mallet type:This [the Mallet] was so designed to provide a very large engine unit, to be managed by a single crew, but to spread the dead weight over many axles and thus avoid excessive loads on the track and under-line bridges, and at the same time retain flexibility of wheelbase to facilitate operation on severely curved sections of line. The Mallet, having driving-wheel units beneath the boiler, retains the limitation in dimensions inherent in the orthodox type of steam locomotive, while the immense length of some of these machines is itself a handicap. Except with oil firing, ... one cannot put the cab in front. H.W. Garratt ... patented ... the idea of having a single large boiler slung on a cradle carried on two entirely separate engine units. ... The boiler could be developed to ideal proportions, unfettered by any wheels beneath it. It could be kept short, and of large diameter, which is the best possible form for securing a high rate of evaporation.

A further advantage is that the firebox and ashpan are not restricted in dimensions by running gear; the ashpan can have much larger capacity than on a normal locomotive, allowing longer continuous runs without needing to stop and empty the ashpan to clear combustion products from the grate. A large firebox and its unrestricted air supply also allowed the Garratt to operate with poor-quality fuel without reducing steaming capacity.

Garratts ran equally well in either direction, negating the need for turntables. Often they ran with the cab leading the boiler (sometimes called [fuel] bunker leading), especially on routes with tunnels.

Most Garratts were designed for freight or mixed traffic, but several Garratt classes were designed for passenger service. Garratts operating at higher speeds had one advantage over the Mallet design on account of the geometry of the design. When swinging around curves, the boiler and cab unit moved inward, reducing the centrifugal force, whereas the Mallet's forward articulated unit moved out as the locomotive rounded curves.

Although at the end of the steam locomotive era, most conventional steam locomotives had reached their maximum in "critical dimensions", the Garratt still had potential for further development, with larger driving wheels, larger boilers, and greater output still achievable.

Disadvantages of the Garratt concept
The major disadvantage of a Garratt (shared with all tank engines) is that the adhesive weight decreases as the water is used from the front tank and coal from the rear bunker. As the weight on the wheels decreases, slipping occurs.

Competitors, look-alikes, and variations on the theme

The Garratt was not alone in the field of articulated locomotives; most notably, articulated locomotives in the United States based on the Mallet design achieved power outputs far exceeding those of Garratts. Away from North America were the Fairlie and Meyer articulated types. Further, similar designs to the Garratt were the Union Garratt, Modified Fairlie, and Golwé. Of these, the closest was the Union Garratt, a type originally prompted by the perceived necessity for a rigid connection between a bunker or tender and a firebox fed by a mechanical stoker. They were, in effect, a hybrid Fairlie and Garratt with the rear bunker attached to the frame instead of being carried on the rear bogie. The class GH and class U Union Garratts of the South African Railways were examples.

Garratt development

The Garratt articulated locomotive concept was developed by Herbert William Garratt, a British locomotive engineer who was granted a patent (no. 12079). At the time, he was the New South Wales Railways' inspecting engineer in London following a career with British colonial railways. Garratt first approached Kitson & Company with his design, but his idea was rejected, perhaps because that company were already committed to the Kitson-Meyer articulated design. He then approached Beyer, Peacock & Company, which were only marginally more interested.

The first Garratts
In 1907, Beyer, Peacock and Company submitted a proposal for a  gauge  Garratt to the New South Wales Government Railways, which was not proceeded with. The following year a design for a  gauge Mallet locomotive was submitted in reply to an enquiry from the Government of Tasmania. The company then proposed a Garratt design based on, but a little heavier than, the design for New South Wales, with capacity to negotiate curves of  radius and 1 in 25 gradients. The proposal was accepted, and two locomotives were built in 1909, which became the K class.

The Tasmanian Railways stipulated two features that were not in Herbert Garratt's original concept. The first was a compound configuration in which two high-pressure cylinders were on the rear engine unit and a pipe led to two larger, low-pressure cylinders on the front engine unit. The second was to have the cylinders facing inwards, which would reduce the distances between both the main steam pipe and the high-pressure cylinders and between the high-pressure and low-pressure cylinders. The latter feature made the locomotive unnecessarily complicated and placed the high-pressure cylinders directly underneath the cab, making it uncomfortably hot for the crew on the rare days when Tasmania's West Coast Range was warm. Only one more Garratt locomotive was produced with compound propulsion (by Beyer, Peacock & Co. in 1927 for Burma Railways). The company  built no more Garratts with inward-facing cylinders, but two Garratts operated by the Southern Fuegian tourist railway at Ushuaia in Argentina, largely based on the K class, have that feature.

Early design and construction difficulties involved the steam-tight flexible connections between the boiler unit and the power units. However, Beyer, Peacock's engineers solved them after studying a description of the spherical steam joints used on a Fairlie locomotive.

Darjeeling Himalayan Railway
The third Garratt (another , like the first two) was built in 1910 for the Darjeeling Himalayan Railway and given the class letter "D". The power output was intended to be double that of the line's existing  locomotives, but only a 65% increase in loading was achieved.

First main-line class
In 1911, Beyer, Peacock & Company built six  Garratts for the Western Australian Government Railways. The M class were followed by the Ms class and the Msa class. These locomotives formed the pattern for the Victorian Railways narrow gauge G class and the Australian Portland Cement Garratts.

Final Garratts constructed
Beyer, Peacock built more than a thousand Garratt or Beyer-Garratt locomotives.

Production list
The following list shows known Garratt construction by all manufacturers.

Garratts around the world

Garratts were used in Africa, Asia, Australia, Europe, and South America. No Garratts were used on North American railroads, the most likely explanation being that American rail companies considered the Garratt's coal and water capacities insufficient for their requirements.

Africa

The Garratt was most widely used in Africa: large numbers were in South Africa, Rhodesia (now Zimbabwe) and Algeria, and smaller numbers in Angola, Congo, Ghana, Ivory Coast, Kenya, Libya, Madagascar, Mozambique, Nigeria, Senegal, Sierra Leone, Sudan, Uganda and Zaïre.

Algeria
In Algeria, 29  Garratts, constructed between 1936 and 1941 by the Société Franco-Belge de Matériel de Chemins de Fer at Raismes in Northern France, operated until the Algerian independence war caused their withdrawal in 1951. This class, designated 231-132BT, was streamlined and featured Cossart motion gear, mechanical stokers and  driving wheels, the largest of any Garratt class. On a test in France, one of these achieved a speed of —a record for any Garratt class (and indeed any articulated class).

Angola
All three main railways in Angola used Garratts. The largest user was the  gauge Caminho de Ferro de Benguela. Forty-eight were purchased from Beyer, Peacock between 1926 and 1956. They came in four batches: class 10A (301–306); class 10B (311–324) in 1930; class 10C (331–348) in 1954; and class 10D (361–370).

The second-largest user was the Caminhos de Ferro de Luanda, which bought six  locomotives (501–506) from Beyer, Peacock in 1949, and six more (551–556) from Krupp of Germany in 1954.

The third user was the Caminhos de Ferro de Moçâmedes, who bought six  locomotives (101–106) from Henschel & Son of Germany.

Botswana
Garratts operated on  gauge through trains from South Africa to Rhodesia.

Kenya, Tanzania and Uganda 
Kenya and Uganda Railways and Harbours, which operated railways in British East Africa and the Uganda Protectorate from 1929 to 1948, acquired 77 Garratts between the same years. The Tanganyika Railway also acquired 3 in 1928. In 1948, the railways merged to form the East African Railways and Harbours Corporation, commonly known in the railways context as East African Railways, shown by the letters "EAR" on rolling stock.

In addition to the 80 acquired Garratts, East African Railways operated 63 that it purchased new between 1954 and 1956, making a total of 143. More details are in the following table.

The 34 oil-fired locomotives remained in regular service until 1980. , the Nairobi Railway Museum held two of them.

Mozambique
 and  Garratts operated in Mozambique, some built as late as 1956.

Rhodesia / Zimbabwe and Zambia

Rhodesia imported 246  gauge Garratts of four different wheel arrangements: s of the 13th, 14th and 14A classes; s of the 15th class, s of the 16th, 16A, and 18th classes; and s of the 20th and 20A classes. Many went to Zambia Railways in 1967 when Rhodesia Railways surrendered the lines in Zambia to its government. Zimbabwe's economic and political situation has extended the life of its Garratts. Five Garratts, including some from the Zimbabwe National Railway Museum, were returned to service in 2004–05 to haul commuter trains.  they were performing shunting duties around the city of Bulawayo.

Sierra Leone
On the Sierra Leone Government Railway, this  gauge system had  Garratts starting in the 1920s and in the middle 1950s purchased 14  Garratts.

South Africa
In 1921, the South African Railways held a comparative trial between three  locomotives: a class 14B 4-8-2 tender engine; a class MH Mallet 2-6-6-2, and a newly arrived class GA Garratt 2-6-0+0-6-2 – the first Garratt of that gauge to enter service in South Africa. The trial was conducted on the line between Durban and Ladysmith, which had gradients as steep as 1 in 30 and curves as tight as  chains in radius. The Garratt proved the superior locomotive in all regards.

The most powerful of all Garratts irrespective of gauge were the South African Railways' eight  gauge GL class locomotives of 1929–30, which delivered  of tractive effort. They were all out of service by the late 1960s. There was also a proposal for a quadruplex super Garratt locomotive with a 2-6-6-2+2-6-6-2 wheel arrangement for South African Railways, but this was never built.

On the two foot gauge lines in South Africa, several successive classes of Garratts were made, of which the NG G16 became the most powerful steam locomotive ever built for the gauge. Some of these were imported to Wales for the Welsh Highland Railway.

Sudan
Sudan operated at least one  Garratt.

Asia

Myanmar (Burma)
Burma had 43 metre gauge Garratts. Five B class  Garratts went to the Burma Railway Company between 1924 and 1927, with seven more built by Krupp of Germany in 1929. They were followed by 31 locomotives transferred from India for War Department service: ten  locomotives, class GB (ex-Indian class MWGL); twelve  locomotives of class GC (ex-Indian class MWGH); and nine  locomotives of class GD (ex-Indian class MWGX). A class of four  locomotives, the GE class, was built for Burma Railways in 1949, but was diverted to the Assam Railway in India.

Two 0-6-0+0-6-0 2 ft 6in gauge Beyer-Garratts were supplied to the Buthidaung-Maungdaw Tramway which became the Arakan Light Railway. BP works Nos. 5702 & 5703 of 1913 refer.

Ceylon (now Sri Lanka)
Ceylon had 10 Garratts: an H1 class   in 1924, a C1 class   in 1927 and eight more C1 class  gauge s in 1945.

India

India had 83 Garratts. One  gauge  was built for the Indian State in 1925. The  gauge Bengal Nagpur Railway had 32 Garratts: a pair of HSG class  locomotives built in 1925; 16 N class and 10 NM class  locomotives built in 1930–31 and four P class  locomotives built in 1939.

The metre gauge Assam-Bengal Railway had six T class  locomotives built in 1927. They later became the GT class on the Bengal Assam Railway. Three types of Garratt were supplied for war service on the BAR: ten MWGL class  locomotives; twelve MWGH  locomotives; and 18 MWGX class  War Department standard light Garratts. Of these, only nine MWGX stayed in India, with the remainder transferred to Burma. After the war, the four Burma Railways GE class s were diverted to the Assam Railway.

Iran
The Trans-Iranian Railway had four  Garratts (class 86) built in 1936.

Mauritius
Mauritius had three standard gauge  Garratts that were built in 1927.

Nepal
The Nepal Government Railway (NGR) had  Garratt locomotives manufactured by Beyer, Peacock and Company in 1932 and 1947.

Siam (Thailand)

The Royal State Railway of Siam acquired 8 Garratts built by the German company Henschel during 1929–1937 for heavy freight duties in the Pak Chong highland areas. One has been preserved; it is displayed at Kanchanaburi railway station.

Turkey
Turkish State Railways had just one standard gauge  Garratt that was built in 1927.

Australasia

Most states of Australia had sets of Australian Standard Garratt with varying degrees of success during the Second World War and for the decade after.

New South Wales

New South Wales Government Railways introduced the  AD60 Garratt in 1952, built by Beyer, Peacock. The AD60 weighed 265 tonnes, with a 16-tonne axle loading. These locomotives remained in service until the early 1970s with a replacement "6042" using the boiler cradle of 6043 (The original was scrapped in 1968) the last withdrawn in February 1973. Oberg wrote he witnessed an AD60 clear a dead 1220-tonne double-headed diesel freight (total weight 1450 tonnes) from a 1 in 55 grade without wheel slip. Four AD60's survive today: 6029 (which operates occasionally out of Thirlmere), 6039 (under private ownership at Dorrigo Museum), 6040 (on static display at THNSW, Thirlmere), & 6042 (also owned by the Dorrigo museum but sitting in the middle of a field in Forbes, NSW).

Queensland
Queensland Railways operated 30 Beyer Garratt locomotives. These were mainly based in the Rockhampton area.

South Australia

One of ten Garratts delivered in 1953 to the South Australian Railways – number 409 – is on static display at the National Railway Museum, Port Adelaide, South Australia. The locomotives were ordered in 1951 from Beyer, Peacock & Company, when there was a need for more and bigger motive power to haul the heavy ore trains on the 1067 mm (3 ft 6 in) narrow-gauge line between Broken Hill and Port Pirie. The company subsequently subcontracted the order, with main specifications identical to those of the notable 60th class of the East African Railways, to Société Franco-Belge, its European associate based in Raismes.

By 1955 the 400 class had taken over most of the working of the Broken Hill line. They operated as oil-burners, with provision for a mechanical stoker to be installed if converted to burn coal. They were also designed to be easily converted for service on either the broad or standard gauge. They were superseded by diesel power in 1963.

Tasmania
Following the success of the K class Garratts on the North East Dundas Tramway, the Tasmanian Government Railways imported Beyer, Peacock Garratts for their main lines, in particular the  M class for express passenger work. These were the only eight-cylinder Garratts. Their 5-foot (1.5 m) diameter driving wheels were at the time the largest on any narrow-gauge locomotive in Australia. Their eight cylinders proved a nightmare to maintain, and after several fatal and disastrous derailments in the late 1920s, mainly due to inadequate trackwork, they were withdrawn and scrapped.

Victoria
Victorian Railways operated two Beyer Garratts, used on the Crowes and Walhalla narrow-gauge railway lines. The two engines were classified as G class, numbered G41 and G42; the latter engine has been restored. It is currently in use at the Puffing Billy Railway near Melbourne. It was not used in public service on that line prior to the preservation era.

New Zealand

Beyer, Peacock built three  NZR G class locomotives in 1928, which were too powerful for the system and had complicated valve mechanisms. Unusually, these engines had three cylinders each, on two sets of engine frames, thus creating a six-cylinder Garratt; they were the second and final Garratts to employ this arrangement, the other being the one-off LNER U1. They entered service in 1929. Walschaerts valve gear operated the outside cylinders with the inner third cylinder linked by a Gresley conjugated valve gear. Photos verify the coal bunker was carried on an extension to the boiler frame rather than on the rear engine frame, as with most Garratts. The engines delivered  of tractive effort, which was too powerful for the drawbars on the rolling stock. After a few years they were rebuilt as six Pacifics, also unsuccessful, but which saw nearly twenty years of service.

Though no NZR Garratts survived, there are three preserved imported African Garratts in New Zealand. Rhodesia Railways class 15A No. 398 of the Flying 15 Trust, Pakakarakiki, class 14A No. 509 of Mainline Steam Trust Plimmerton (under restoration), and South African Railways GMAM class No. 4083 at Mercer Auckland with the Mainline Steam Trust awaiting restoration. When it first arrived in NZ in the 1990s, it was steamed and ran in their former Parnell Depot yard. See preservation below.

Europe
Garratts were mainly employed in Great Britain, Russia, and Spain, where some five railway companies employed seven classes. These included the 1931 order for Central of Aragon Railway for six  "Double Pacific" Garratts for fast passenger service. In addition a Dutch and a Belgian tramway also operated one or more engines based on and built to the Garratt design.

Netherlands
In 1931, the Dutch Limburgsche Tramweg Maatschappij (LTM) 'Limburg tramway company' ordered a single standard gauge Garratt, numbered LTM 51, from Henschel (Germany) with builder's number 22063. This design was slightly different in that the coal bunker was located on the boiler frame and both machines only holding the watertanks. More importantly, it was the only Garratt with inside cylinders. The wheel arrangement was C+C. Due to abandonment of the line in 1938, the locomotive was sold to a metal merchant, who in turn sold it to an engineers' bureau, that sold it in 1941 to Germany. Further whereabouts of this machine are unknown, but it is presumed scrapped.

Spain
Spain had a varied collection of Garratts from most builders; Beyer, Peacock themselves only building a pair of  s for Rio Tinto in 1929. The first Garratts in Spain, however, were four metre gauge s built for the Ferrocarriles Catalanes in 1922 by Sociéte Anonyme St. Leonard of Liége, Belgium. Four more followed in 1925. Also on the metre gauge, the Ferrocarril de la Robla bought two pairs of s, the first from Hanomag of Germany in 1929, the second from Babcock & Wilcox of Bilbao in 1931. The Compania Minera de Sierra Minera also bought a pair of metre-gauge s in 1930.

On the broad gauge, the Central of Aragon Railway bought six s from Babcock & Wilcox and six s from Euskalduna of Bilbao, both in 1931. The last Garratts supplied to Spain were 10 s for Renfe by Babcock & Wilcox in 1960.

United Kingdom

British usage of Garratts was minimal. A single large Garratt (London and North Eastern Railway Class U1 number 2395/9999/69999) was built in 1925 for banking heavy coal trains on the Woodhead route; 33  Garratts were built for the London, Midland and Scottish Railway between 1927 and 1930, although their undersized axle-boxes made them unreliable and they were withdrawn in the mid-1950s. They were also trialled unsuccessfully on the Lickey Incline between Bromsgrove and Birmingham.

Four standard-gauge Garratt locomotives were supplied by Beyer, Peacock for industrial service in the UK. One survived and is preserved at Bressingham Steam Museum. No. 6841  William Francis was built in 1937 for use at Baddesley Colliery.

On the Welsh Highland Railway, a  narrow-gauge tourist line in Wales, a few imported South African NGG16 Garratts haul the greater part of service trains on the railway.

USSR

The locomotive had the Russian classification Ya.01 (Я.01). It underwent extensive testing and proved to be very able to operate in extremely low temperatures, due to adequate protection of the external plumbing between boiler and engine units. This may have been the lowest temperature operation of a Garratt type. The locomotive was used for a number of years for coal traffic in the Donbass region, but was never replicated. This decision appears to be a combination of unfamiliar maintenance processes and politics.

North America
No Garratts appeared in North America, although American Locomotive Company became the sole licensee to build Garratts there. Alco was unable to garner sufficient interest from US railroads to produce even a prototype or demonstrator.  This reluctance was reportedly based on a concern that tractive effort and factor of adhesion would suffer as the weight of water and fuel over the driving wheels diminished.

United States
In 1975, one  Garratt NG class No. 50 formerly of the South African Railways was imported and is used on the private  gauge Hempstead & Northern Railroad in Hempstead, Texas, which also operate another former South African Railways  "Mikado" type No. 18.

South America

Argentina
The British-owned  gauge Buenos Aires Great Southern Railway operated twelve Garratt  oil-fired locomotives, numbers 4851–4862, built by Beyer, Peacock in 1929. They were used on the Bahía Blanca North Western section, particularly on the Toay line), on the main Bahía Blanca North Western line to General Pico, and between Tres Arroyos and Bahía Blanca. They were withdrawn in the 1950s due to the rapid decline in freight traffic caused by the increasing competition from road transport.

Other British-owned railway companies in Argentina operated Garratt locomotives built by Beyer, Peacock:
 Argentine North Eastern Railway ( gauge): seven  locomotives built 1925–1927 and three , built 1930
 Argentine Transandine ( gauge): four , built 1930
 Buenos Aires and Pacific Railway ( gauge): four , built 1929–1930
 Buenos Aires Midland Railway ( gauge): two , 1930
 Cordoba Central Railway ( gauge) : ten , built 1929
 Entre Rios Railway ( gauge): five  and five , built 1927

The Southern Fuegian Railway at Ushuaia uses two  gauge Garratts to haul tourist trains.

Bolivia
Three meter gauge  were delivered to the Antofagasta and Bolivia Railway in 1929, followed by six more in 1950.

Brazil
In Brazil after 1927, the São Paulo Railway operated broad-gauge  Garratts that ran passenger trains at 70 mph.

Colombia
In Colombia, one  gauge  Garratt was purchased by the FC Pacifico in 1924 and two more by the La Dorada in 1937.

Peru
Four  standard gauge Garratts were delivered to the Central Railway of Peru from 1929 to 1931. (Donald Binns, The Central Railway of Peru and The Cerro de Pasco Railway, 1996)

War locomotives
During World War II, several Garratt designs were built to meet the wartime needs of narrow-gauge railways in Africa, Asia, and Australia.

Six  Garratts were built for the  gauge Sierra Leone Government Railway in 1942, to a design first supplied to that railway in 1926. Five of the older Garratts were converted to a  wheel arrangement to increase their tractive effort.

Seventy Garratts were constructed by Beyer, Peacock for the War Department, to three standard designs. A lighter metre-gauge  was constructed for India, Burma, and East Africa. This design was particularly successful, and was the basis for several postwar classes.

The Australian Standard Garratt  was designed in 1942, for use on  gauge railways, in the critical period of World War II following the Japanese bombing of Darwin in 1942, and aerial attacks on other northern Australian centres. It was a  locomotive, designed in Australia and constructed by a number of Australian railway workshops. Several design problems with the class emerged, and use of the locomotive encountered resistance from the drivers' union, especially in Queensland. Most were withdrawn at the end of the war, although a number continued to operate successfully in Tasmania.

Preservation

About 250 Garratts may exist today. However, many are dumped in varying states of disrepair in remoter parts of the world, and the number that may be likely to survive has been estimated as fewer than 100. , about 15 operating Garratt locomotives can be found in Europe, Africa, Argentina, the US and Australia.

The first Garratt locomotive, the K class of the North-East Dundas Tramway, has been preserved. After the line closed in 1929 the locomotives were put up for sale. K1 was purchased by Beyer, Peacock in 1947 for their museum. The preserved locomotive has parts from both original engines.  When Beyer, Peacock ceased trading, the locomotive was sold to the Ffestiniog Railway, who initially proposed to cut it down to meet their loading gauge. For a number of years it was on loan to the National Railway Museum and was exhibited in York. In 1995 it was removed from York to commence restoration in Birmingham. It was returned to Wales in 2000 where restoration was continued at the Ffestiniog Railway workshops at Boston Lodge. It was fitted with a new boiler and restored to full running order on the Welsh Highland Railway by September 2008. The Welsh Highland Railway owns several former South African SAR NGG 16 Class Garratts, and operates both the first (K1) and last (NG/G16 143) Garratts constructed by Beyer, Peacock.. The K1 ten year boiler ticket expired in 2014. Even though the locomotive had worked infrequently, a full boiler overhaul was required to meet UK regulations. The FR/WHR declined to fund this activity sighting lack of revenue generating opportunities for the locomotive and the need to maintain their core fleet of NG/G16 locomotives. Finally, in 2019 it was decided to move the locomotive to the Statfold Barn Railway in Central England on a ten year loan with two boiler overhauls in the agreement. The first boiler overhaul was quickly completed along with other work at a cost of 60,000 GBP and the locomotive seen in steam at Statfold in February 2020.

In Spain, a  number 282F-0421, nicknamed "Garrafeta",  occasionally ran in the Lleida area but no longer. An enormous , number 462F-0401, is under slow cosmetic restoration. Both locomotives are managed by ARMF, a non-profit organisation which also holds the only main line repair workshop for historical railway vehicles on broad gauge network.

A single Hanomag-built narrow gauge example exists in the USA located in Hempstead Texas. It has been made operational again since November 2015.

Several Australian Garratts have been restored to operating condition. G 42, formerly used on the narrow gauge lines of the Victorian Railways, works regularly on the Puffing Billy Railway in the Dandenong Ranges outside Melbourne. The Puffing Billy Railway is also rebuilding ex SAR NG/G16 129 which entered service in late 2019. The Queensland Railways removed 1009, its sole remaining  gauge  Garratt, from an open-air museum and fully restored it to working order. It was out of service by December 2007, awaiting a new boiler. NSWGR AD60 6029 was restored to operating condition in Canberra. As of 2018, 6029 is privately owned and is stored at Thirlmere, NSW. It is occasionally used by the NSW Rail Museum on mainline excursions.

In Kenya, East African Railways 59 class 5918 was maintained in operating condition from 2001 to 2011. Likewise in Zimbabwe 20th class 730 and 740 were held in operating condition until 2004. They have not run since 2004 when 730 was briefly used on Bulawayo commuter services. None are likely to operate again without external funding for major repairs as the only work available for them are excursion trains for foreign tourists and rail enthusiasts.

No New Zealand Railways G class Garratts survived, but three more modern Southern African Garratts have been imported for restoration in New Zealand, with No.509's boiler certified and restoration nearing completion as of 2018.

Beyer Peacock No.7340 of 1950 Rhodesia Railways class 15A No.398 The Flying Fifteen Group, Steam Incorporated Paekakariki (stored).
Beyer Peacock No.7582 of 1953 Rhodesia Railways class 14A No.509. Mainline Steam Heritage Trust, Plimmerton  (under restoration).
Beyer Peacock No. 7681 of 1956 South African Railways GMAM class No.4083 Mainline Steam Heritage Trust, Mercer (stored).

In December 2007, Zimbabwe class 14A Garratt number 509, overhauled in Bulawayo was offloaded in New Zealand for operational preservation by the Mainline Steam trust. In early 2011 Zimbabwe 15th class 398 was also delivered to New Zealand for restoration to operating condition by Steam Inc.

As of December 2020 there is only one place in the World where one can with reasonable confidence view a Garratt in daily operating service. Ushuaia, Argentina whilst Dinas in North Wales offers the sight of daily operation for about 10 months of the year.

In September 2018, South Eastern Zone of Indian Railways made a successful trial run of a Beyer-Garratt numbered 811 from Kharagpur. A heritage service is planned and scheduled to start from the upcoming festival season.

In fiction 
In the movie Big World! Big Adventures! of the television program, Thomas & Friends, an EAR 59 class Garratt, named Kwaku, was introduced.

See also 
2 ft gauge railways in South Africa

Notes

References

Sources

Further reading

External links

 
 
 

 
Steam locomotive types